may refer to:

 Colonel (Canada)#Honorary ranks and appointments
 Colonel commandant#United Kingdom
 Colonel (United Kingdom)#Honorary Colonel
 Colonel (U.S. honorary title)

see also:

 Colonel-in-chief